Somethin' Nasty is the seventh solo studio album by American rapper Uncle Luke. It was released on March 13, 2001 through Luke Records/Koch Entertainment Label Alliance. Production was handled by Mr. Mixx, Daz Dillinger, Gorilla Tek, and Luke himself. It features guest appearances from Sporty G, Pitbull, Jiggie Gee, Daz Dillinger, No Love, Cam'ron, Kurupt, Lil Zane, Snoop Dogg, HonoRebel, Shelly Diva, Sciryl, Kid Capri, DJ Kizzy Rock and DJ Smurf. The album peaked at #149 on the Billboard 200, #36 on the Top R&B/Hip-Hop Albums and #6 on the Independent Albums.

Track listing

Charts

References

External links

2001 albums
E1 Music albums
Luther Campbell albums